Ruth's Two Husbands (German: Die beiden Gatten der Frau Ruth) is a 1919 German silent film directed by Rudolf Biebrach and starring Henny Porten, Curt Goetz and Meinhart Maur.

The film's sets were designed by Kurt Dürnhöfer and Jack Winter

Cast
 Henny Porten as Ruth Elvstedt 
 Curt Goetz as Ingenieur Robert Holversen  
 Meinhart Maur as Notar Lars Sidellius  
 Paul Passarge 
 Erich Schönfelder as Baron Alfred Alberg  
 Elsa Wagner 
 Else Wojan 
 Emmy Wyda

References

Bibliography
 Alfred Krautz. International directory of cinematographers, set- and costume designers in film, Volume 4. Saur, 1984.

External links

1919 films
Films of the Weimar Republic
German silent feature films
Films directed by Rudolf Biebrach
UFA GmbH films
German black-and-white films
1910s German films